Tim Gilligan (born February 17, 1981) is a former American football wide receiver who played two seasons with the Montreal Alouettes of the Canadian Football League (CFL). He played college football at Boise State University and attended Elko High School in Elko, Nevada.

College career
Gilligan played for the Boise State Broncos from 2000 to 2003. He earned first All-WAC receiver and second team All-WAC punt-returner honors his senior season in 2003. He also set a school record for receiving yards in a season with 1,192 while also totalling a career-high 67 receptions and six touchdowns.

Professional career
Gilligan signed with the CFL's Montreal Alouettes in June 2004. He played for the Alouettes  during the 2004 and 2005 seasons.

Personal life
In 2007, Gilligan took a job as a prison guard with the Idaho Maximum Security Institution. In September 2009, he was arraigned on a charge of felonious sexual misconduct. Gilligan admitted to having sexual relations with a female inmate. He was sentenced to three years in prison.

References

External links
Just Sports Stats
College stats

Living people
1981 births
Players of American football from Nevada
American football wide receivers
Canadian football wide receivers
American players of Canadian football
Boise State Broncos football players
Montreal Alouettes players
People from Elko, Nevada